Outside the Window is a 1973 Taiwanese romantic film directed by Sung Tsun-shou, based on the novel of the same name by Chiung Yao. It was released in British Hong Kong on August 24, 1973, but due to copyrights issues, was not publicly screened in Taiwan until 2009. The film was Brigitte Lin's acting debut.

Plot 
Jiang Yanrong (江雁容), a high school student deprived of parental love, falls in love with her teacher Nan Kang (康南).  However, their relationship is not tolerated by society because of their twenty-year age gap and student-teacher relationship.  Yanrong is afraid that she will be a burden to Nan, who is the best teacher in the school, and Nan Kang is worried that he may damage Yangrong's reputation.  They decide to end their affair despite still being in love.  After Yanrong's graduation, Nan is fired by the school.  Yanrong wants to commit suicide but is saved by her mother.  She confesses that she still has feeling for Nan Kang and begs her mother to let them marry.  To calm her down, her mother pretends to give her permission, but goes to the school to accuse Nan of seducing her daughter, and Nan is fired again.  A few years later, Yanrong marries Li Liwei (李立維), but is often beaten and humiliated by him.  She leaves home to search for Nan, but only finds that his spirit is broken and he has become a dirty old man that she does not recognize.

Cast 
Brigitte Lin as Jiang Yanrong (江雁容)
Hu Qi as Nan Kang (康南)
Chin Han as Li Liwei (李立維)

References

External links  
互动百科：窗外

1973 films
1973 romantic drama films
Taiwanese romantic drama films
Films based on works by Chiung Yao
Films directed by Sung Tsun-shou